The Monmouth Courthouse may refer to:
Monmouth County Courthouse, in Freehold Borough, New Jersey
Monmouth Courthouse Commercial Historic District, listed on the NRHP in Monmouth, Illinois
Monmouth Courthouse, New Jersey, an earlier name for Freehold Borough, New Jersey